|}

The Heron Stakes is a Listed flat horse race in Great Britain open to three-year-old thoroughbreds. It is run at Sandown Park over a distance of 1 mile, and it is scheduled to take place each year in late May.

The event was formerly held at Kempton Park. It was staged at Goodwood in 2005 and 2006, and transferred to Sandown Park in 2007.

The Heron Stakes is usually part of a fixture called the Brigadier Gerard Evening which also features the Brigadier Gerard Stakes and the Henry II Stakes. The Heron Stakes was held at a separate meeting a week before Brigadier Gerard Evening in 2021.

Records

Leading jockey since 1978 (5 wins):

 Frankie Dettori – Lord Florey (1990), Proclamation (2005), Cogito (2012), Without Parole (2018), King of Comedy (2019)

Leading trainer since 1978 (10 wins):
 Sir Michael Stoute – Dalsaan (1980), Spark of Life (1981), Diaglyphard (1985), Neshad (1987), Magical Strike (1989), Among Men (1997), Kalaman (2003), Final Verse (2006), Tazahum (2011), Consort (2015)

Winners since 1978

See also
 Horse racing in Great Britain
 List of British flat horse races

References

 Paris-Turf:
 Racing Post:

 pedigreequery.com – Heron Stakes – Sandown.

Flat races in Great Britain
Sandown Park Racecourse
Flat horse races for three-year-olds